This article is about the gross regional product (GRP) per capita of regions of the United Kingdom, defined as Level 2 regions of the Nomenclature of Territorial Units for Statistics (NUTS 2), in nominal values. Values are shown in euros in the original source. For comparison, all figures are converted into pounds sterling and US dollars according to annual average exchange rates. All values are rounded to the nearest hundred.

2018

See also 
NUTS statistical regions of the United Kingdom

Notes

References 

Economy of the United Kingdom-related lists
United Kingdom geography-related lists
Gross state product
 GRP per capita
United Kingdom